Khouribga is the capital of Khouribga Province in the Béni Mellal-Khénifra region, Morocco. With a population of 196,196 (2014 census), Khouribga owes its growth to the phosphate deposits nearby.

Geography
Located at 120 km from Casablanca, 154 km from the capital, Rabat, more than 200 km from the city of Marrakesh, and about 99 km from the city of Beni Mellal and 60 km from the city of Settat.

Khouribga is located 820 meters above sea level on the Ouardigha plateau. The city was founded in 1923 by the authorities of the French protectorate when they discovered phosphate in the region, for which Morocco is considered to be the biggest exporter in the world. There are several mines in the province, most notably the mine of Sidi Shennan near the town of Oued Zem, which lies 30 km from the village of Boulanouar (5 km) and the town of Boujniba (10 km) and the village of Hattane.

The Province of Khouribga is bordered by the Province of Beni Mellal in the east, Province of Ben Slimane in the west, the Province of Settat in the south, and Khémisset Province in the north.

Climate
Khouribga has a hot-summer Mediterranean climate (Köppen climate classification Csa). In winter there is more rainfall than in summer. About  of precipitation falls annually.

Economy

Phosphate

The Province of Khouribga has a large phosphate reserve estimated 35 to 40 billion cubic meters, which has been mined since 1920s and is ranked first at the international level. Also Khouribga is one of the cities that brings hard currency and that is due to its community residents from Italy.

The phosphate mines in the Ouled Abdoun Basin are notable source of fossils, especially Mosasaur and Sharks jaws and teeth.

Industrial activities
In addition to phosphate mining, the province knew the emergence of other industries in economic sectors such as:
 Electrical and electronics industry
 Chemical industry
 Food Industry
 Mechanical Industry
 Textiles

Industrial areas
The province has three Industrial zones:
 The industrial zone of Khouribga (industrial district): 20 hectares (234 partitions) and 13 operating industrial units plus the expansion of the zone.
 The industrial zone of Oued Zem.
The industrial zone of Bejaad.

Services
The province has several services, among them:
 25 bank agencies
 6  insurance agencies
 7  travel agencies
 2 railways with daily trips with a project to build a modern station.

Agriculture
The agricultural lands is divided into 50% arable land, 20% forests, 30% unused land.
Livestock is the most important source of income for the rural population, the herd is estimated to be:
 Goats: 30.000-60.000 heads
 Equidae: 40.000-60.000 heads
 Cows: 50.000-70.000 heads
 Sheep: 500.000-600.000 heads

Handicrafts
The handicrafts sector represents a sizable part of the local economy with 9 cooperatives (260 members), and a handicrafts association.

Health
The facilities cover most of the province with:
 6 rooms
 3 provincial hospitals
 20 health centers
 7 urban health centers
 9 rural clinics

Twin towns – sister cities

Khouribga is twinned with:
 Alcamo, Italy
 Erzincan, Turkey
 Karaj, Iran

Notable people
 Adam Masina, professional footballer
 Hicham Mahdoufi, Former international footballer 
 Hindi Zahra, international singer
 Hind Dehiba, née Chahyd, born on March 17, 1979, in Khouribga, a Moroccan-French middle-distance runner
 Jawad El Yamiq, professional footballer
 Mohamed Saïd El Wardi, Former middle-distance runner 
 Otmane El Assas, former professional footballer
 Rababe Arafi, middle-distance runner
 Walid El Karti, professional footballer

See also
 Office Cherifien des Phosphates

References

Populated places in Khouribga Province
Municipalities of Morocco
Khouribga